Very Hard Choices is a science-fiction/suspense-mystery novel from Canadian science fiction author Spider Robinson, released in June 2008.  The novel, set in British Columbia, is a sequel to Very Bad Deaths and continues the story of the reclusive telepath known as Smelly.

Plot

In this novel, Nika and Russell discover that protecting the secret of Smelly's telepathic abilities has brought them into conflict with the Central Intelligence Agency, who have been pursuing him since his escape from the MKUltra Project in the 1960s.

Characters
Zandor "Smelly" Zudenigo, recluse and telepath 
Russell Walker, newspaper columnist 
Jesse, Russell's son, an American public relations executive
Constable Nika Mandiç of the Vancouver Police Department

Critical reception

David Gerrold has said "Spider Robinson is at his best when he is most passionate – and this is Spider Robinson at his very best. If you're expecting a nice polite distraction that you can put down and forget, you're going to be very annoyed. This isn't a story, it's a wake-up call. And it isn't over until you decide it's over."

External links
  Spider Robinson's "Spider on the Web" podcast – includes readings from this book

References 

2008 Canadian novels
2008 science fiction novels
Canadian science fiction novels
Canadian mystery novels
Novels set in British Columbia
Baen Books books
Works about Project MKUltra